Lanner may refer to:

People
Lanner (surname), list of people with this name

Places
Lanner, Cornwall
Lanner Gorge in South Africa

Birds
Lanner falcon

Companies
Lanner Inc.
Lanner Group Ltd

See also
 Lana (disambiguation)